May Golan (born 3 May 1986) is an Israeli politician, political activist and commentator. She was elected to the Knesset for Likud in the 2022 elections. She was formerly the CEO of the NGO Hebrew City,  and also worked as a campaigner against illegal immigration.

Early life
Golan was born May Flora Golan Badra in Tel Aviv, Israel, to a Mizrahi Jewish family, the child of a single Orthodox Jewish mother who made Aliyah from Iraq as a 3-year-old girl as part of Operation Ezra and Nehemiah. She grew up near the old central bus station in South Tel Aviv. She still lives today in South Tel Aviv, with her mother - previously on Mount Zion Street and today in Kfar Shalem.

At the age of 9, she was interviewed on television with her mother, who was described as an archetype of distress being a single mother living on a social security pension in a deprived area of the city, on Channel 1, as part of a report on annual poverty in Israel. Following the broadcast, May was contacted by Gila Almagor and her Wish Foundation charity. As a result of Almagor's help, she was identified as a child with potential by the municipality, who invited her to attend Ironi Dalet High School, in the higher socioeconomic North Tel Aviv sector of the city,  where she was bullied for her South Tel Aviv background.

Political career 
After failing to establish herself as a sports journalist, Golan became politically active in 2011, campaigning to raise awareness about the impact of undocumented immigrants from Africa on south Tel Aviv. She became a highly recognisable face in the campaign against the presence of undocumented immigrants in Tel Aviv.

In 2013 she established the organization "Hebrew city", which stood for election to the Tel Aviv city council, but was disqualified for technical reasons.

In the 2013 Israeli legislative election, she was placed at the 10th place candidate for the Otzma Leyisrael party, however the party won no seats. In elections of the 20th Knesset, she was placed 32nd as a candidate for the Likud party which ultimately went on to receive the highest number of votes.

Media career 
May Golan has been a frequent guest on political panels on television channels in Israel. She has also been interviewed by international media organizations, such as the BBC, Reuters, Fox News, I24News and RTVI.

In 2014, she was chosen as one of the 66 women to be aware of, by the newspaper Haaretz.

In 2015, she was selected as 'Woman of the Year' in the social field by Israel's Channel 7.

In July 2022 TikTok  banned her post on violence in South Tel Aviv for incitement to racism.

References

External links 

 May Golan's Column for Maariv (Hebrew)
 May Golan interview for Ynet (Hebrew)

1986 births
Living people
21st-century Mizrahi Jews
Israeli Jews
Israeli people of Iraqi-Jewish descent
Jewish Israeli politicians
Likud politicians
Members of the 21st Knesset (2019)
Members of the 23rd Knesset (2020–2021)
Members of the 24th Knesset (2021–2022)
Members of the 25th Knesset (2022–)
Politicians from Tel Aviv
Women members of the Knesset